Henry Muhlenberg (1711–1787) was a founder of the Lutheran Church in the United States.

Henry Muhlenberg is also the name of:
Gotthilf Heinrich Ernst Muhlenberg (1753–1815), American botanist, Lutheran pastor, and the first president of Franklin College
Henry A. P. Muhlenberg (1782–1844), Lutheran minister and Pennsylvania Congressman
Henry Augustus Muhlenberg (1823–1854), attorney and Pennsylvania Congressman, son of Henry A. P. Muhlenberg
Henry Augustus Muhlenberg (1848–1906)
Henry Muhlenberg (mayor), American politician